Fearless Photog is a character created for Mattel's Masters of the Universe toyline. A heroic warrior with a robotic camera-shaped head, he has the ability to ‘focus in’ on his enemies and drain their strength. His chest plate displays silhouettes of his defeated enemies.

Development
In 1986, Mattel sponsored a contest for children to send in designs for new characters. Five finalists were chosen, and people were then allowed to vote for their favorite. In the last page of the Spring 1986 issue of The Masters of the Universe Magazine, they announced 12-year-old Nathan Bitner as the winner of the contest with his submission of Fearless Photog. Nathan was awarded a scholarship for 100,000 dollars, plus a five-day trip to Disneyland.

Despite the contest's premise, however, Fearless Photog never actually went into production. While claiming they no longer have the rights to produce an action figure of this character, Mattel gave it a small nod in 2011 on the bio of its Masters of the Universe Classics figure Captain Glenn. At San Diego Comic-Con International 2011, Mattel later revealed that Fearless Photog would finally receive a figure as the first entry in their six-figure Masters of the Universe Classics 30th Anniversary series.

References

American superheroes
Male superheroes
Mascots introduced in 1986
Toy mascots
Male characters in advertising
Fictional cyborgs
Fictional soldiers
Masters of the Universe Heroic Warriors